Singin'... is a 1977 album release by Melissa Manchester on Arista Records.

This was Manchester's sixth album and fourth and final collaboration with producer Vini Poncia, who had produced her 1975 commercial breakthrough, Melissa.

After the first of Manchester's two 1976 album releases, Better Days and Happy Endings, failed to consolidate her stardom, Arista had attempted to restore Manchester's chart fortunes by making the lead single from the subsequent Help Is on the Way album not a Manchester original, but rather the Michael Franks composition "Monkey See, Monkey Do". This strategy proving unsuccessful, Arista then had Manchester record Singin'... which eschewed Manchester's songwriting – save for one track: "No One's Ever Seen This Side of Me" – in favor of outside material, including remakes of hits by Michael Jackson ("I Wanna Be Where You Are"), Sly and the Family Stone ("Stand"), Three Dog Night ("Let Me Serenade You") and the Beach Boys ("The Warmth of the Sun"). The track listing was completed by Manchester's versions of songs written and previously recorded by James Taylor ("You Make It Easy") and Wendy Waldman ("My Love Is All I Know") and a new song: "Sad Eyes", written by David Spinozza, who played guitar on the album.

Upon its 1977 summer release, Singin'... failed to boost Manchester's faded chart presence, with the release of "I Wanna Be Where You Are" as a single being overlooked. However, the track did attract the attention of the song's composer Leon Ware, who became Manchester's producer for what would ultimately prove to be her comeback album, Don't Cry Out Loud (although that album's top ten hit title cut would be produced by Harry Maslin).

Track listing
 "Sad Eyes" (David Spinozza) – 4:05
 "I Wanna Be Where You Are" (Arthur Ross, Leon Ware) – 3:50
 "A Love Of Your Own" (Ned Doheny)  – 4:02
 "No One's Ever Seen This Side of Me" (Melissa Manchester) – 3:18
 "You Make It Easy" (James Taylor) – 5:08
 "Stand" (Sly Stone) – 4:03
 "My Love Is All I Know" (Wendy Waldman) – 3:37
 "Time" (Robert Marshall, John Miles) – 4:17
 "Let Me Serenade You" (John Finley) – 3:52
 "The Warmth of the Sun" (Brian Wilson) – 4:53
2007 CD re-issue bonus tracks
 "Come in From the Rain"  – 4:20
 "Long Goodbyes" – 2:59
 "My Boyfriend's Back"  – 5:34

Personnel
 Melissa Manchester – lead vocals
 Don Grolnick – keyboards
 James Newton Howard – Oberheim synthesizer (1, 5, 7), string arrangements (1, 8)
 Jeff Mironov – guitar (1, 2, 4, 6-9)
 David Spinozza – guitar (1, 2, 4, 6-9)
 Sid McGinnis – guitar (3, 5, 10)
 Will Lee – bass guitar (1, 3, 6, 7, 9)
 Tony Levin – bass guitar (2, 4, 5, 8, 10)
 Steve Gadd – drums
 Lenny Castro – percussion
 Tom Saviano – woodwind arrangements (1, 7), flute (1, 7), horn arrangements (3, 6), tenor saxophone (3, 6)
 Mike Carnahan – flute (1, 7)
 Leo Potts – flute (1, 7)
 Andy Macintosh – baritone saxophone (3, 6)
 Stanley Schwartz – tenor saxophone (3, 6), tenor sax solo (10)
 George Bohanon – trombone (3, 6)
 Richard Felts – trumpet (3, 6), flugelhorn solo (7)
 Sid Sharp – concertmaster (1, 8)
 Vini Poncia – backing vocals
 Claudia Cagan – backing vocals
 Wendy Haas – backing vocals
 Brie Howard – backing vocals
 Gail Kantor – backing vocals
 The Faragher Brothers – backing vocals

Production
 Producer – Vini Poncia
 Engineer – Bob Schaper
 Second Engineer – Tom Bush
 Recorded at A&R Studios and Sound Labs (Hollywood, CA).
 Mixed by Galen Senogles at Producers Workshop (Hollywood, CA).
 Mastered by Ron Hitchcock at The Mastering Lab (Hollywood, CA).
 Production Coordinator – Anne Streer
 Cover Coordinator – Kay Steele
 Art Direction and Design – John Kosh
 Photography – David Alexander

1977 albums
Albums produced by Vini Poncia
Melissa Manchester albums
Arista Records albums